Section 187 (often referred to in slang simply as 187) of the California Penal Code defines the crime of murder. The number is commonly pronounced by reading the digits separately as "one-eight-seven", or "one-eighty-seven", rather than "one hundred eighty-seven".

The number "187" has been used by gangs throughout the United States and elsewhere as a synonym for murder; this usage has been documented in Florida, Wisconsin, the United Kingdom, Germany and Norway. It also features widely in hip-hop culture, such as in Dr. Dre's "Deep Cover".

California Penal Code Section 187 
California Penal Code section 187, subdivision (a) defines murder as "the unlawful killing of a human being, or a fetus, with malice aforethought". Subdivision (b) states that subdivision (a) does "not apply to any person who commits an act that results in the death of a fetus if any of the following apply: (1) The act complied with the Therapeutic Abortion Act [citation]. (2) The act was committed by a holder of a physician's and surgeon's certificate [citation], in a case where, to a medical certainty, the result of childbirth would be death of the mother of the fetus or where her death from childbirth, although not medically certain, would be substantially certain or more likely than not. (3) The act was solicited, aided, abetted, or consented to by the mother of the fetus."

In California, suspects are usually charged by reference to one or more Penal Code (PC) sections. Thus, the charging documents for a suspect charged with murder would be inscribed with "PC 187(a)" or just "PC 187". If a suspect is charged with attempted murder, then the relevant code would be "PC 664/187" because attempt is defined in Penal Code section 664. 

Under the California Uniform Bail Schedule, the standard bail for murder is $750,000.  The standard bail for first-degree murder with special circumstances (that is, circumstances under which the district attorney is seeking the death penalty) is "NO BAIL".

Notable uses 
In the song "April 29, 1992 (Miami)" by Sublime, Bradley Nowell used the lyrics "And screamin' 1-8-7 on a motherfuckin' cop," alluding to Dr. Dre's song. The lyrics are related to the riots that ensued after the video evidence and eyewitnesses of police brutality, the beating of Rodney King and the violence that was evident during that year.

In the 1999 movie Magnolia, police officer Jim Kurring (played by John C. Reilly), thinking Claudia (played by Melora Walters) is involved in a situation domestic abuse, remarks that things can often go bad if the victim does not speak up, and he does not want to come out to a "one eighty-seven", a reference that Claudia does not understand, but he does not elaborate.

In the 2002 EP From the Depths of Dreams by the post-hardcore band Senses Fail, there is a track titled "One Eight Seven", with subject matter surrounding murder. It was one of their better known songs, but the band retired it from their live sets in 2013 due to the lyrical themes and Buddy Neilsen feeling that he had personally moved on from the song. In 2019, the band re-imagined From the Depths of Dreams including the song "One Eight Seven", which they had not played live in over five years.

See also
 Law enforcement jargon
 187 Strassenbande
 187 (professional wrestling)

References

External links

English-language slang
Hip hop phrases
Murder in California
Murder in the United States